The Nuannuan Ande Temple is a temple in Nuannuan District, Keelung, Taiwan. The temple is dedicated to the Goddess Mazu, the Goddess of Sea and Patron Deity of fishermen, sailors and any occupations related to sea/ocean. The temple is an important and prominent place of worship in Nuannuan District.

History
The temple was originally constructed in 1801. Since then, it has undergone several renovations, with the last major reconstruction completed in 1996.

Transportation
The temple is accessible by walking distance west from Nuannuan Station of Taiwan Railways.

See also
 Qianliyan & Shunfeng'er
 List of Mazu temples around the world
 Ciyou Temple, Songshan District of Taipei
 Guandu Temple, Beitou District of Taipei
 List of temples in Taiwan
 Religion in Taiwan

References

1801 establishments in Taiwan
Tourist attractions in Keelung
Mazu temples in Keelung